William Thomas Clucas (14 April 19258 July 2016), better known as William Lucas, was an English film, theatre, radio and television actor.

Early years 
William Lucas was born in Manchester, England. Before he became an actor, he was a commercial traveller, laundry hand, cook, farm labourer, and long-distance lorry driver, and served in the Royal Navy during the Second World War.

Career 
Lucas earned a scholarship to the Northern Theatre School, and trained there. He then became an assistant stage manager at the Chesterfield Civic Theatre in the late 1940s. Lucas had begun his stage career by the summer of 1950 in Chesterfield and was still active in the theatre in late 1990 in Run for Your Wife.

His first film acting role was in the film Portrait of Alison (1955), and he later appeared in many Hammer Film Productions such as The Shadow of the Cat (1961). 

He starred in a string of British crime b-movies such as Payroll, The Break, Breakout, and Calculated Risk. He usually played strong villain-types (lead villains) but he would also play unhinged, weak characters as well.  

Lucas is probably best known for his role in The Adventures of Black Beauty (1972–1974) as Dr. James Gordon, and in the BBC series Sir Arthur Conan Doyle's Sherlock Holmes as Inspector Lestrade in the episode "A Study in Scarlet" (1968). He also appeared in The Bill, Doctor Who, Last of the Summer Wine, Sir Francis Drake (TV series) and the ITV soap opera Coronation Street.

Personal life
In 1954, Lucas married Doreen Moorehouse (whose stage name was Rowena Ingram). They had two children. After they divorced he married Camilla Idris-Jones.

Death
Lucas died in England on 8 July 2016.

Filmography

Film
Timeslip (1955) - X-Ray Technician (uncredited)
Portrait of Alison (1955) - Reg Dorking
Lost (1956) - Press Photographer (uncredited)
X the Unknown (1956) - Peter Elliott
Up in the World (1956) - Mick Bellman
High Flight (1957) - Controller (Cranwell)
Breakout (1959) - Chandler
Sons and Lovers (1960) - William Morel
Crack in the Mirror (1960) - Kerstner
The Professionals (1960) - Philip Bowman
Payroll (1961) - Dennis Pearson
The Shadow of the Cat (1961) - Jacob Venable
The Devil's Daffodil (1961) - Jack Tarling (English Version)
Touch of Death (1961) - Pete Mellor
The Break (1962) - Jacko Thomas
The Very Edge (1963) - Inspector Davis
Bitter Harvest (1963) - Mr. Medwin
The Marked One (1963) - Don Mason
Calculated Risk (1963) - Steve
Dateline Diamonds (1966) - Major Fairclough
Night of the Big Heat (1967) - Ken Stanley
The Sky Bike (1967) - Mr. Smith
Scramble (1970) - (uncredited)
Tower of Evil (1972) - Inspector Hawk
Man at the Top (1973) - Marshall
Operation Daybreak (1975) - Doctor (Sonja's Father) (uncredited)
The Plague Dogs (1982) - Civil Servant #5 (voice)

Television
 Portrait of Alison (1955) - Reg Dorking
 Solo for Canary (1958) - Durea
 Champion Road (1958) - 	 Jonathan Briggs
The Adventures of Robin Hood (1958) - Sir Jack of Southwark
The Infamous John Friend (1959, BBC) - John Friend
The Adventures of William Tell (1959) - Kramer
Sir Francis Drake (1962) - Count Julio
Danger Man (1965) - Bernhard
The Saint (1965, Episode: "Crime of the Century") as Crantor
Z-Cars (1965–1967) - Det. Insp. Carter / Frank Jordan
The Avengers (1967–1968) - Brett / Stapley
The Prisoner (1967–1968)
Sir Arthur Conan Doyle's Sherlock Holmes (1968, Episode: "A Study in Scarlet") - Inspector Lestrade
Dixon of Dock Green (1968–1971) - Sawyer / Philip Chapman
Doctor at Large (1971) - QC Mortimer Turnbull
Coronation Street (1971, 1996) - Dennis Maxwell/Judge Parrish
The Adventures of Black Beauty (1972–1974) - Dr. James Gordon
The Protectors (1973) - Eastbrook
The Spoils of War (1980–1981) - George Hayward
Doctor Who (1984, Episode: "Frontios") - Mr Range
The New Adventures of Black Beauty (1990–1992) - Dr. James Gordon
On the Up (1992) - Sir Douglas Hoyle
Eldorado (1992–1993) - Stanley Webb
Last of the Summer Wine (2003) - Norris

References

External links

 William Lucas Obituary in The Guardian

1925 births
2016 deaths
English male film actors
English male television actors
English male stage actors
Male actors from Manchester
Royal Navy personnel of World War II